Sabina of Bavaria-Munich (24 April 1492 – 30 August 1564) was Duchess consort of Württemberg by marriage to Ulrich, Duke of Württemberg.

Biography

Family
Sabina was the daughter of Albert IV, Duke of Bavaria and his wife Kunigunde of Austria, daughter of Frederick III, Holy Roman Emperor and Eleanor of Portugal.

Duchess consort
Sabina was promised at the age of six years for strategic reasons by her uncle, King Maximilian I, to Ulrich of Württemberg to whom she was married 15 years later. This marriage was unhappy because of Ulrich's tendency to violence, so that Sabina was ultimately forced to flee from Württemberg without her two children and seek shelter with her brothers in Munich.

When, in 1551, her son, Christoph, inherited the throne of Württemberg, Sabina moved to Nürtingen, which was then the official widow's residence of the Württembergs.  There she led a small court and being an educated woman turned it into a meeting place for Württemberg's Protestants.

With Ulrich of Württemberg she had two children: Christoph, Duke of Württemberg (12 May 1515 – 28 December 1568), and Anna (30 January 1513 – 29 June 1530).

Ancestors

External links
  Portrait and biography

Bavaria, Sabina of
Bavaria, Sabina of
House of Wittelsbach
Duchesses of Bavaria
House of Württemberg
Daughters of monarchs